This discography of jazz pianist McCoy Tyner contains albums that were released under his own name as well as albums on which he appeared.

As leader

Compilations 
 The Best of McCoy Tyner (Blue Note, 1996) – recorded in 1967–1970
 Solar: Live at Sweet Basil (Alfa/Sweet Basil, 1997) – combined the same title album (1991) and Key of Soul (1992)
 The Best of the McCoy Tyner Big Band (Birdology/Dreyfus Jazz, 2002) – combined The Turning Point (1992) & Journey (1993)
 Afro Blue (Telarc, 2007) – recorded in 1998–2003

As sideman 

with John Coltrane
 Coltrane Plays the Blues (Atlantic, 1962) – recorded in 1960
 Coltrane Jazz (Atlantic, 1961) – only on "Village Blues"
 Coltrane's Sound (Atlantic, 1964) – recorded in 1960
 My Favorite Things (Atlantic, 1961)
 Olé Coltrane (Atlantic, 1961)
 Africa/Brass (Impulse!, 1961) 
 Coltrane "Live" at the Village Vanguard (Impulse!, 1962) – recorded in 1961
 Coltrane (Impulse!, 1962)
 Ballads (Impulse!, 1963) – recorded in 1961–62 
 John Coltrane and Johnny Hartman (Impulse!, 1963)
 Impressions (Impulse!, 1963)
 Live at Birdland (Impulse!, 1963)
 Crescent (Impulse!, 1964)
 A Love Supreme (Impulse!, 1965) – recorded in 1964
 The John Coltrane Quartet Plays (Impulse!, 1965)
 The New Wave in Jazz (Impulse!, 1965) – live
 Ascension (Impulse!, 1966) – recorded in 1965
 New Thing at Newport (Impulse!, 1966) – live recorded in 1965
 Meditations (Impulse!, 1966) – recorded in 1965
 Kulu Sé Mama (Impulse!, 1967) – recorded in 1965
 Om (Impulse!, 1968) – recorded in 1965
 The Coltrane Legacy (Atlantic, 1970) – compilation of outtakes recorded in 1959–61
 Transition (Impulse!, 1970) – recorded in 1965
 Sun Ship (Impulse!, 1971) – recorded in 1965
 Afro Blue Impressions (Pablo, 1977) – recorded in 1963
 First Meditations (Impulse!, 1977) – recorded in 1965
 To the Beat of a Different Drum (Impulse!, 1978) – recorded in 1963–65
 Like Sonny (Roulette, 1990) – recorded in 1960 and released in original form in 1962
 Living Space (Impulse!, 1998) – recorded in 1965
 Both Directions at Once: The Lost Album (Impulse!, 2019) – recorded in 1963

with Curtis Fuller
 1959: Imagination (Savoy, 1960)
 1960: Images of Curtis Fuller (Savoy, 1960)

with Grant Green
 1964: Matador (Blue Note, 1979)
 1964: Solid (Blue Note, 1979)

with Freddie Hubbard
 1960: Open Sesame (Blue Note, 1960)
 1960: Goin' Up (Blue Note, 1961)
 1961: Ready for Freddie (Blue Note, 1962)
 1965–66: Blue Spirits (Blue Note, 1967)

with Joe Henderson
 1963: Page One (Blue Note, 1963)
 1964: In 'N Out (Blue Note, 1965)
 1964: Inner Urge (Blue Note, 1966)

with Bobby Hutcherson
 1966: Stick-Up! (Blue Note, 1968)
 1981–82: Solo / Quartet (Contemporary, 1982)

with Milt Jackson
 1964: In a New Setting (Limelight, 1965)
 1964–65: I/We Had a Ball (Limelight, 1965) – 1 track

with Hank Mobley
 1965: A Caddy for Daddy (Blue Note, 1967)
 1966: A Slice of the Top (Blue Note, 1979)
 1966: Straight No Filter (Blue Note, 1985)

with Lee Morgan
 1964: Tom Cat (Blue Note, 1980)
 1966: Delightfulee (Blue Note, 1967)

with Wayne Shorter
 1964: Night Dreamer (Blue Note, 1964)
 1964: JuJu (Blue Note, 1965)
 1965: The Soothsayer (Blue Note, 1979)

with Stanley Turrentine
 1964: Mr. Natural (Blue Note, 1980)
 1966: Rough 'n' Tumble (Blue Note, 1966)
 1966: Easy Walker (Blue Note, 1968)
 1966: The Spoiler (Blue Note, 1967)
 1967: A Bluish Bag (Blue Note, 2007)
 1967: The Return of the Prodigal Son (Blue Note, 2008)

with others
 George Benson, Tenderly (Warner Bros., 1989)
 Art Blakey, A Jazz Message (Impulse! 1964) – recorded in 1963
 John Blake, Jr., Maiden Dance (Gramavision, 1984) – recorded in 1983
 Donald Byrd, Mustang! (Blue Note, 1967) – recorded in 1966
 Lou Donaldson, Lush Life (Blue Note, 1980) – recorded in 1967
 Art Farmer and Benny Golson, Meet the Jazztet (Argo, 1960)
 Steve Grossman, In New York (Dreyfus Jazz, 1993) – recorded in 1991
 J. J. Johnson, Proof Positive (Impulse!, 1964) – 1 track
 Blue Mitchell, Heads Up (Blue Note, 1968) – recorded in 1967
 David Murray, Special Quartet (DIW/Columbia, 1990)
 Julian Priester, Spiritsville (Jazzland, 1960)
 Flora Purim, Encounter (Milestone, 1977) – recorded in 1976
 Sonny Rollins, Ron Carter, and Al Foster, Milestone Jazzstars in Concert (Milestone, 1978)
 Avery Sharpe, Unspoken Words (Sunnyside, 1989) – recorded in 1988
 Woody Shaw, Jackie McLean, Cecil McBee, and Jack DeJohnette, One Night with Blue Note Preserved Volume Two (Blue Note, 1985)
 Sonny Stitt, Loose Walk (Musica Jazz/Philology, 1993) – recorded in 1966

References 

McCoy Tyner Discography Project accessed March 24, 2009
McCoy Tyner Sessionography accessed March 24, 2009

External links
 

 
Jazz discographies